Bernd Gersdorff (born 18 November 1946) is a German former professional footballer who played as a midfielder.

Club career 
Gersdorff was born in Berlin-Wilmersdorf. He spent 12 seasons in the Bundesliga with Eintracht Braunschweig, FC Bayern Munich and Hertha BSC.

International career 
Gersdorff also played once for the West Germany national team (on 3 September 1975 in a friendly against Austria).

Honours
Bayern Munich
 Bundesliga: 1973–74

Hertha BSC
 DFB-Pokal runners-up: 1976–77, 1978–79

References

External links
 
 
 
 
 Profile at NASLjerseys.com

1946 births
Living people
Footballers from Berlin
German footballers
Association football midfielders
Germany international footballers
Germany B international footballers
Bundesliga players
Tennis Borussia Berlin players
Eintracht Braunschweig players
FC Bayern Munich footballers
Hertha BSC players
San Jose Earthquakes (1974–1988) players
San Diego Sockers (NASL) players
North American Soccer League (1968–1984) players
West German expatriate footballers
West German expatriate sportspeople in the United States
Expatriate soccer players in the United States
West German footballers